Prince Kelechi Amukamara (born June 6, 1989) is an American football cornerback who is a free agent. He played college football for Nebraska, and earned unanimous All-American honors.  He was drafted by the New York Giants in the first round of the 2011 NFL Draft, and was a member of the Giants' Super Bowl XLVI championship team as a rookie against his hometown team, the New England Patriots. Amukamara has also played for the Jacksonville Jaguars, Chicago Bears, Las Vegas Raiders, and Arizona Cardinals.

Early years
Amukamara was born in Leominster, Massachusetts, to parents Romanus and Christy Amukamara, both natives of Nigeria. He soon moved to New Jersey before moving to Glendale, Arizona, when he was five years old. He has five sisters, named Princess, Promise, Peace, Precious, and Passionate. Prince is of Igbo Nigerian descent, His mother competed for Nigeria at the 1984 Summer Olympics in track and field. His father is a teacher.

Amukamara attended Apollo High School in Glendale, Arizona, where he excelled in multiple sports. Most notably, Amukamara was a track & field standout in several events, and was one of the Hawks' most explosive weapons on the football field. Through six games in the 2006 season, he had rushed for 1,129 yards and 270 receiving yards on offense and recorded two interceptions on defense. He also had scored 18 offensive touchdowns and three defensive touchdowns. He finished the season with 2,106 rushing yards and 24 touchdowns as a running back and 95 tackles and two interceptions as a defensive back. The Arizona Republic named him the "Big School Player of the Year" in Arizona. Amukamara was also named to the Arizona All-State team by Scout.com.

Regarded as a three-star recruit by Rivals.com, Amukamara was listed as the 11th best prospect from Arizona. On December 29, 2006, Amukamara committed to play college football at Nebraska. He also received scholarship offers from Colorado, Fresno State, Nevada, Oregon State, UNLV, and UTEP. During his senior year of high school, when asked what he thought about the recruiting process, he responded, "I'm not worried about the recruiting now. I will look at it closer after the season."

College career
Amukamara attended the University of Nebraska, and played for the Nebraska Cornhuskers football team from 2007 to 2010.  After arriving at Nebraska, Amukamara contemplated playing basketball on top of football, but dropped those plans after fall football practices began. As a freshman in 2007, Amukamara was described as being a newcomer "with a lot of personality" by senior linebacker Corey McKeon. He made his debut for Nebraska on September 22 against Ball State, playing on special teams. Amukamara finished the year with four tackles in eight games, splitting time in the secondary and on special teams.

Entering his sophomore season, there was speculation as to whether he would play at running back or cornerback, before being named the back-up cornerback after training camp. He ended up starting the games against Western Michigan, New Mexico State, and Virginia Tech, as he played in all 13 of Nebraska's games. He finished the year with 34 tackles, with his season-high of eight coming against Western Michigan.

As a junior, Amukamara became a starter at cornerback for Nebraska. Against Louisiana-Lafayette, Amukamara suffered an injury during the game, but did not miss any games. Amukamara finished the 2009 season with five interceptions, tied for the most on the team, 11 pass-breakups, 64 tackles, and two sacks. He was named to the first-team All-Big 12 after the season.

Amukamara tallied 59 tackles and one sack, but no interceptions as a senior.  However, he only allowed 18 completed passes in his direction on 52 attempts during the season, and was praised for his "lock-down ability" against wide receivers during the season. Following the season, he was recognized as a unanimous first-team All-American, and the Big 12 Defensive Player of the Year. Amukamara was also a Jim Thorpe Award finalist, a Chuck Bednarik Award semifinalist, and a Ronnie Lott Trophy quarterfinalist.

While at the University of Nebraska, Amukamara majored in political science and received his degree in sociology in December 2010.

College statistics

Professional career
Prior to his senior season at Nebraska, a National Football League (NFL) scouting service gave Amukamara a 7.3 rating, which was tied for the highest among 1,400 college seniors that were graded. Sports Illustrated described him as being "physical, possessing solid football speed and top ball skills." They later gave a him a first round grade after other NFL scouts had named him one of the best two seniors in all of college football. He was projected to be a first round draft pick by the majority of NFL draft experts and scouts. Amukamara received an invitation to the NFL combine and completed all of the required positional and combine drills. On March 10, 2011, he participated at Nebraska's pro day along with teammates Niles Paul, Roy Helu, Alex Henery, Eric Hagg, Dejon Gomes, and 12 others. He opted to only perform positional drills for team representatives and scouts who attended. Amukamara was ranked as the second best cornerback prospect in the draft by NFLdraftscout.com, NFL analyst Mike Mayock, and NFL analyst Brian Billick.

New York Giants
The New York Giants selected Amukamara in the first round (19th overall) of the 2011 NFL Draft. He was the second cornerback selected behind Patrick Peterson (5th overall).

2011
On August 4, 2011, the New York Giants signed him to a four-year, $8.18 million contract with 90% guaranteed. He was the longest hold out of the 2011 draft class. On August 6, 2011, he was sidelined indefinitely after breaking the fifth metatarsal in his left foot during practice.

On November 20, 2011, Amukamara made his professional regular season debut against the Philadelphia Eagles and recorded a season-high five solo tackles, two pass deflections, and intercepted a pass from Vince Young on the first series of a Giants' 10–17 loss. In Week 14, he collected four solo tackles during a 37–34 victory over the Dallas Cowboys. He finished his rookie season with 14 combined tackles (12 solo), three pass deflections, and an interception in seven games and zero starts. The New York Giants finished the  season with a 9–7 record and received a playoff berth.

On January 8, 2012, Amukamara made his postseason debut and recorded two combined tackles in a 24–2 victory over the Atlanta Falcons during the NFC wildcard game. The Giants went on to defeat the Green Bay Packers 37-20 and the San Francisco 49ers 20–17 in overtime winning the NFC Championship.
On February 5, 2012, he made one tackle in a 21–17 victory over the New England Patriots in Super Bowl XLVI.

Throughout his rookie season in 2011, he was the New York Giants' third cornerback on their depth chart, behind Aaron Ross and Corey Webster.

2012
He competed with Aaron Ross, Terrell Thomas, Jayron Hosley, and Justin Tryon for the starting cornerback job. He suffered a high ankle sprain during the Giants' preseason game against the Chicago Bears. The injury kept him sidelined for the first two games of the season.

On September 20, 2012, he made his 2012 season debut, recording a tackle and a pass deflection in a 36–7 defeat of the Carolina Panthers. The following week, he earned four solo tackles and a pass deflection during a 17–19 loss to the Philadelphia Eagles. On October 14, 2012, Amukamara collected six solo tackles, a season-high three pass deflections, and intercepted a pass from Alex Smith in a 26–3 win against the San Francisco 49ers. In Week 10, he recorded a season-high ten combined tackles during a 13–31 loss to the Cincinnati Bengals. He missed Week 15 and was limited in Week 16 due to a hamstring injury. He finished the season with 53 combined tackles (45 solo), seven pass deflections, and an interception in 13 games and 11 starts.

2013
In training camp, Amukamara competed with Aaron Ross, Corey Webster, and Jayron Hosley for the starting cornerback position. He was named the starting cornerback with Corey Webster to start the  season.

On September 15, 2013, Amukamara recorded a career-high ten solo tackles and defended a pass during a 23–41 loss to the Denver Broncos. On September 29, 2013, he collected three combined tackles, defended two passes, and intercepted Kansas City Chiefs' quarterback Alex Smith in a 7–31 loss. He finished the season with a career-high 85 combined tackles (76 solo), 14 pass deflections, and an interception in 16 games and 16 starts.

2014
On May 1, 2014, the New York Giants picked up the fifth-year option for 2015 on Amukamara's rookie contract. He earned a salary of $6.89 million for 2015.

He competed with Dominique Rodgers-Cromartie and Walter Thurmond for the starting cornerback job. Head coach Tom Coughlin named him the starting cornerback alongside Rodgers-Cromartie.

On September 14, 2014, he recorded a season-high nine combined tackles and a pass deflection during the Giants' 14–25 loss to the Arizona Cardinals.
The following week, he earned six combined tackles, two pass deflections, and intercepted a pass from Ryan Fitzpatrick during a 30–17 victory over the Houston Texans. In Week 4, Amukarmara recorded three combined tackles, two pass deflections, and intercepted Washington Redskins' quarterback Kirk Cousins in a 45–14 victory. He tore his bicep on November 3, 2014, ending his season. He finished with a total of 46 combined (37 solo), 11 deflected passes, and career-high three interceptions.

2015
Amukamara started the Giants' season-opener against the Dallas Cowboys and recorded a season-high eight combined tackles during a 26–27 loss. In Week 3, he made a season-high eight combined tackles, three pass deflections, and intercepted Washington Redskins' quarterback Kirk Cousins during a 32–21 victory. On October 11, 2015, he suffered an injury to his pectoral during a 30–27 victory over the San Francisco 49ers. Amukamara missed Week 6-10 due to the injury. In Week 15, he recorded a season-high seven solo tackles and defended two passes during a 35–38 loss to the Carolina Panthers.

Jacksonville Jaguars

2016
On March 11, 2016, the Jacksonville Jaguars signed Amukamara to a one-year, $5.5 million contract that included $3 million guaranteed and a signing bonus of $1.5 million.

Amukamara competed against Davon House, Jalen Ramsey, Aaron Colvin, Dwayne Gratz, and Josh Johnson throughout training camp for the starting cornerback job. Head coach Gus Bradley named Amukamara the starting nickelback, alongside Davon House and Jalen Ramsey,
to begin the season.

He started the Jacksonville Jaguars' season-opener against the Green Bay Packers and recorded two combined with tackles and a pass deflection. He missed Weeks 2 and 3 due to a hamstring injury.

Chicago Bears

2017
On March 10, 2017, the Chicago Bears signed Amukamara to a fully guaranteed one-year, $7 million contract with a signing bonus of $3.5 million.

Throughout training camp, he competed with Marcus Cooper, Sherrick McManis, Bryce Callahan, and Kyle Fuller for the Bears' starting cornerback position. Head coach John Fox named him the Bears' starting cornerback to begin the  season.

On August 27, 2017, Amukamara suffered an ankle injury on the first play of a 19–7 preseason victory over the Tennessee Titans. He missed the last preseason game and the first two regular season games due to the ankle injury. In Week 3, he made his Chicago Bears debut and collected three combined tackles and defended two passes in a 23–17 overtime victory over the Pittsburgh Steelers. On October 9, 2017, Amukamara made his first start of the season and made four solo tackles in a 17–20 loss to the Minnesota Vikings.

2018

On March 13, 2018, Amukamara signed a three-year, $27 million extension with the Bears. On September 17, 2018, Amukamara recorded his first career interception for a touchdown on quarterback Russell Wilson in the 24–17 victory over the Seattle Seahawks on Monday Night Football.

In week 10 against the Detroit Lions, Amukamara intercepted quarterback Matthew Stafford and also made eight tackles. The Bears won the game 34–22.
In week 14 against the Los Angeles Rams, Amukamara intercepted Jared Goff which sealed a 15-6 Bears win.
Amukamara finished the season with 66 tackles, 12 passes defended, and 3 interceptions, including a pick six. He received an overall grade of 81.0 from Pro Football Focus in 2018, which ranked as the 9th highest grade among all qualifying corner backs.

2019
In week 4 against the Minnesota Vikings, Amukamara made 2 tackles and forced a fumble off Stefon Diggs in the 16–6 win. In week 5 against the Oakland Raiders, he recovered a fumble forced by Sherrick McManis on Trevor Davis at the goal line in the 24–21 loss. A pulled hamstring against the Detroit Lions in week 13 led to him missing the following week's game.

On February 21, 2020, Amukamara was released by the Bears after three seasons in a move to create cap space.

Las Vegas Raiders
On May 18, 2020, Amukamara signed with the Las Vegas Raiders. On August 31, he was released by the Raiders after being on their practice squad.

Arizona Cardinals
On October 13, 2020, Amukamara was signed to the Arizona Cardinals practice squad. His practice squad contract with the team expired after the season on January 11, 2021.

New Orleans Saints
On August 2, 2021, Amukamara signed with the New Orleans Saints. He was released on August 17, 2021.

NFL statistics

Personal life
Amukamara married Pilar Davis in 2014. Amukamara is a Christian, refrains from alcohol, and has stated that he stayed chaste before marriage. He has spoken about his faith saying, "... the feeling of winning the Super Bowl went away pretty quickly. I don’t think about it much unless people remind me. ... But to be a Christian, that’s a daily thing and that’s what I think about the most.

Amukamara is an ambassador for Up2Us Sports, a national non-profit organization dedicated to supporting underserved youth by providing them with coaches trained in positive youth development.

Amukamara takes part in a Chicago Bears' tradition of the "Home Team Hand-Off" program, where Chicago players can purchase season tickets and donate them to a charity of their choice. He chose to donate to "The Other's Program".

References

External links
 
 Nebraska Cornhuskers bio
 NFL combine profile

1989 births
Living people
American sportspeople of Nigerian descent
Players of American football from Arizona
Players of American football from Massachusetts
People from Leominster, Massachusetts
Sportspeople from Worcester County, Massachusetts
Sportspeople from Glendale, Arizona
All-American college football players
American football cornerbacks
Nebraska Cornhuskers football players
New York Giants players
Jacksonville Jaguars players
Chicago Bears players
Las Vegas Raiders players
Arizona Cardinals players
New Orleans Saints players